Had or HAD may refer to:
 had, past tense of the English verb to have; see have (disambiguation)
 Had, an alternative name for Hadit, the Thelemic version of an Egyptian god
 Hole accumulation diode, an electronic noise reduction device 

See also 'had'-based sentence: James while John had had had had had had had had had had had a better effect on the teacher .